Spilosoma pauliani is a moth in the family Erebidae. It was described by Hervé de Toulgoët in 1956. It is found on Madagascar.

References

Moths described in 1956
pauliani